Moghadam House or Moghadam Museum House of the University of Tehran is a historical mansion related to the late Qajar period in Tehran, which was the residence of the Ehtesaba-al-Molk and Moghaddam families and is now a museum of historical objects. This museum house was originally a large and luxurious mansion and the residence of the family of Mohammad Taghi Khan Ehtesab al-Molk,one of the famous officials of the Qajar court and the head of the time accounting office (municipality) of Tehran and the sovereign minister of Iran in Bern, Switzerland. 

It was later owned by his son Mohsen Moghadam , a professor of archeology at the University of Tehran. He and his wife, Selma Kouyoumjian, lived in their father's house in Tehran. Mohsen Moghadam and Selma, who was born in Bulgaria and is the director of the Library of the National Museum of Iran, in addition to scientific activities, collected many works and objects with the aim of preserving the cultural and historical heritage of Iran.

Mohsen Moghadam has installed many valuable collected works such as tiles, carved stone pieces, etc., inspired by the traditional-historical spaces, in a significant way in this old building. He has also gathered some other pieces such as the collection of fabric, Chibouk, smoke pot, hookah, pottery. He has kept glass works, paintings, mosaics, coins, historical documents, etc. in a special order in his parental house.

Architecture 
The space with an area of 2117 square meters includes three outer, inner and caretaker courtyards.

Outer courtyard

Hosekhane 
This basement was built in the Mozaffari period (1324-1313 AH) at the same time as the house was built by Mohammad Taqi Khan Ekhbal al-Mulk - father of Mohsen Moghaddam.The “Hozkhaneh” is decorated with tiles and fragments of terracotta vessels taken from exquisite works belonging to the 4th to 13th centuries A.H., which show the evolution of Iran's pottery and tile industry.

Gallery

See Also 
 Hooshang Seyhoun
 University of Tehran
 List of museums in Tehran
 List of museums in Iran

References 

Historic sites in Iran
Historic house museums in Iran